Space Delta 6 (DEL 6) is a United States Space Force unit which assures access to space through the $6.8 billion Satellite Control Network and defensive cyberspace capabilities for space mission systems.

Activated on 24 July 2020, the delta is headquartered at Schriever Space Force Base, Colorado. It replaced the 50th Network Operations Group, which had been part of the former 50th Space Wing. On 23 June 2021, the 614th Air and Space Communications Squadron, previously under Space Delta 5, was redesignated as the 65th Cyber Squadron and transferred into Space Delta 6.

Emblem symbolism 
Space Delta 6's emblem consists of the following elements:
The platinum border represents the foundation and structure Space Operations Command provides to Space Delta 6.
The midnight blue represents the determination and tenacity of Guardians.
The North Star represents the satellite systems that Space Delta 6 supports.
The lightning bolt represents instantaneous response by each unique operational space mission for Space Delta 6.
The shield and satellite dish symbolizes missions that Space Delta 6 is responsible for: Space Control Network and Cyber Defense.
The number six signifies Space Delta 6's number and the ability to support the warfighting domain.

Structure 
By the end of fiscal year 2022, SpOC intends to establish the Space Cyber Center and 645th Cyberspace Squadron.

Commander

References 

Deltas of the United States Space Force